Geometry, also known as Jihe (Chinese name), is a car marque created by the Chinese car company Geely in April 2019. The Geometry brand is mainly focused on the development of electric vehicles or NEVs. 

Geometry is designed primarily for the Chinese market and announced an ambition to produce more than 10 different electric cars by 2025.

Products
Geometry A- An electric compact sedan based on the Geely Emgrand GL
Geometry C- An electric crossover based on the Geely Emgrand GS
Geometry E- A subcompact electric crossover

References

External links

Official website (in Chinese)

Geely brands
Vehicle manufacturing companies established in 2019